Ebbinghaus is a German surname. Notable people with the surname include:

 Bernhard Ebbinghaus (born 1961), German sociologist
 Heinz-Dieter Ebbinghaus (born 1939), German mathematician
 Hermann Ebbinghaus (1850–1909), German psychologist
 the Ebbinghaus illusion, in experimental psychology
 Julius Ebbinghaus (1885–1981), German philosopher